Mircea Voicu (born 17 April 1980) is a Romanian former footballer who played as a midfielder for various Romanian clubs such as: Universitatea Craiova, Jiul Petroşani, Pandurii Târgu Jiu or Gaz Metan Mediaş, among others.

Honours

Jiul Petroșani
Liga II: 2004–05

ALRO Slatina
Liga III: 2009–10

External links
 
 
 Mircea Voicu at frf-ajf.ro 

1980 births
Living people
Sportspeople from Slatina, Romania
Romanian footballers
Association football midfielders
Liga I players
Liga II players
FC U Craiova 1948 players
SCM Râmnicu Vâlcea players
CSM Jiul Petroșani players
CS Pandurii Târgu Jiu players
CS Gaz Metan Mediaș players